{{Infobox officeholder
|name          = Pir Syed Mohammad Yaqoob Shah|native_name   = پیر سید محمد یقوب شاہ
|image         =
|office        = Member of the Provincial Assembly & Personal Secretary C.M of punjab Ghulam Haider Wayne
|term_start    = 24 October 1990
|term_end      = 8 August 1991
|party         = Pakistan Muslim League
|birth_date    = 
|birth_place   = Phalia, Punjab, Pakistan
|death_date    = 
|children      = Pir Syed Muhammad Binyamin Rizvi & Pir Syed Tariq Yaqoob Rizvi
|alma_mater    = Religious Scholar
|profession    = Politician & A Religious Scholar
}}Pir Syed Mohammad Yaqoob Shah' (d. 31 August 1991) was a Pakistani Member of Punjab Provincial Assembly and religious leader.  He died on 31 August 1991, after having been elected Member of Provincial Assembly (MPA) in the 1990 Pakistani general election.  His son, Pir Syed Muhammad Binyamin Rizvi, was elected as his replacement in the Punjab Provincial Assembly.

History
Pir Syed Mohammad Yaqoob Shah was a spiritual personality of Phalia.  His Waqiya e Qarbla'' is a very famous recording in Punjab. He won the election in 1990 as Member of the Punjab Provincial Assembly from constituency PP-99 Phalia as a candidate of PML. During his tenure he was selected as Advisor to Chief Minister of Punjab Late Ghulam Haider Wain and later  on he was selected as Minister of Ghulam Haider Wain's cabinet.

Family
Peer Yaqoob Shah has two sons both are political personalities of Punjab his elder son's name was Late Peer Binyameen shah rizwi he was a former Member of the Provincial Assembly of the Punjab former minister of Punjab Assembly and former president of PML(N) Punjab. Pir Binyamin was brutally murdered on 24 June 2005. His 2nd son's name is Tariq Yaqoob rizwi Vice President of (PML-N) Punjab and he lost the general election against PPP candidate Asif Bashir Bhagat in 2008. Tariq yaqoob is elected MPA in 2013 election as PML(N) candidate.

Legacy
 Phalia college was renamed after his death to Peer Yaqoob Shah Degree College Phalia. 
 Pilot Secondary School's cricket ground was renamed to his name after his death.

References

Phalia
Date of birth unknown
1991 deaths
Pakistani politicians